Jordan van der Gaag (born 3 January 1999) is a Dutch professional footballer who plays as a midfielder for Portuguese club Leiria.

Club career
Born in The Hague, van der Gaag began as a youth at Portuguese club C.S. Marítimo, where his father was managing. He had several years at S.L. Benfica and a loan to G.D. Estoril Praia before signing a three-year deal at NAC Breda in 2017.

He made his Eredivisie debut for NAC Breda under his father's management on 12 August 2018 in a game against AZ Alkmaar, coming on as a 70th-minute substitute for Mitchell te Vrede in a 5–0 away loss.

In August 2018, he moved on loan for a season to Eerste Divisie side Helmond Sport. He scored his first professional goal, his only one for the club, to open a 2–1 loss at FC Eindhoven on 23 November.

Van der Gaag moved back to Portugal in October 2020, joining his younger brother in the ranks of Belenenses SAD. After a handful of appearances for the reserve team in the Campeonato de Portugal, he made his first-team debut on 14 January 2021 in the fifth round of the Taça de Portugal, as a 65th-minute substitute for Thibang Phete in a 3–2 extra-time win at AD Fafe. On 4 April he made his Primeira Liga bow as a replacement for Sphephelo Sithole in the last nine minutes of a 2–0 home loss to Boavista FC.

On 23 January 2022, Van der Gaag came on as a first-half substitute for Nilton Varela away to his former team Marítimo, and was sent off 32 minutes later in a 1–1 draw.

Van der Gaag signed for Liga 3 team U.D. Leiria on 8 July 2022.

International career
From 2014 to 2017, Van der Gaag earned five caps for the Netherlands from under-15 to under-19 level. His sole appearance for the last of those teams was on 1 September 2017, starting in a 2–2 friendly draw with Portugal in Vaasa, Finland; he was substituted for Donyell Malen after 61 minutes.

Personal life
Van der Gaag is the son of the former professional footballer and current manager, Mitchell van der Gaag, who played for Marítimo and managed that club and Belenenses, among others. His younger brother, Luca, was a teammate at Belenenses SAD. His paternal grandfather, Wim, was one of the first Dutch professional footballers in 1954.

Notes

References

External links

 
 

Living people
1999 births
Footballers from The Hague
Dutch footballers
Association football midfielders
NAC Breda players
Helmond Sport players
Eredivisie players
Eerste Divisie players
C.S. Marítimo players
S.L. Benfica footballers
G.D. Estoril Praia players
Belenenses SAD players
U.D. Leiria players
Primeira Liga players
Campeonato de Portugal (league) players
Dutch expatriate footballers
Expatriate footballers in Portugal
Dutch expatriate sportspeople in Portugal
Netherlands youth international footballers